Anacrusis russomitrana is a species of moth of the  family Tortricidae. It is found in Rio de Janeiro, Brazil.

The wingspan is about 24 mm. The ground colour of the forewings is cinnamon brown, with a slight violet-grey gloss and fine rust brown strigulation (fine streaks). The markings are purple brown. The hindwings are dark brown.

References

Moths described in 2004
Atteriini
Moths of South America
Taxa named by Józef Razowski